An Interacting binary star is a type of binary star in which one or both of the component stars has filled or exceeded its Roche lobe.  When this happens, material from one star (the donor star) will flow towards the other star (the accretor).  If the accretor is a compact star, an accretion disk may form.  The physical conditions in such a system can be complex and highly variable, and they are common sources of cataclysmic outbursts.

A common type of interacting binary star is one in which one of the components is a compact object which is well within its Roche lobe, while the other is an evolved giant star.  If the compact object is a white dwarf, then accretion of material from the evolved star onto the white dwarf's surface may result in its mass increasing to beyond the Chandrasekhar limit.  This can lead to runaway thermonuclear reactions and the massive explosion of the star in a Type I supernova.

An example of such a binary star is R Canis Majoris, in which it is thought that the secondary star has exceeded its Roche lobe and transferred mass to the primary star. This has resulted in the early evolution of the secondary star onto the subgiant star branch, and in exposure of helium-rich material on the surface of the primary, causing it to burn brighter and have a higher effective temperature than would usually be expected for a star of its mass.

See also
 Classical nova

References